Charles Njagua Kanyi, better known by his stage name Jaguar, is a Kenyan politician, singer and philanthropist.

Early life and education 
Kanyi went to Magutu Primary School and later joined Senior Chief Koinange Secondary School where he sat for his Kenya Certificate of Secondary Education examination (KCSE).

Music career 
Jaguar released his first single "Utaweza Kweli" with the record label the Mandugu Digitali in 2004. He joined Ogopa Deejays, an East African music production team, in 2005. With Ogopa Deejays, he released several singles, including his most popular single "kigeugeu". In 2013 Jaguar began recording with Main Switch Studios, founded by one of Jaguar's long serving record producers Philip Makanda, formerly from Ogopa Deejays.

He has since recorded several singles including "Kipepeo", "Kioo" and "One centimeter", an African collaboration featuring popular Nigerian recording artist, Iyanya. He has also featured the popular South African duo Mafikizolo in his single titled "Going Nowhere".

Political career

In 2015, Kanyi was elected as the director of National Campaign Against Alcohol and Drug Abuse where he served for two years. He also became a member of the Departmental Committee on Labour and Social Welfare.

On 9 August 2017, Kanyi was elected to serve the constituency of Starehe in Nairobi for the Jubilee Party after defeating Steve Mbogo, Boniface Mwangi and Mwaniki Kwenya. Jaguar previously defeated the incumbent Member of Parliament, Starehe Maina Kamanda, in a hotly-contested nomination race for the Jubilee Party ticket in April 2017.

On 24 January 2022, Kanyi joined the United Democratic Alliance in a bid to defend his parliamentary sit for Starehe constituency.

References

Living people
Kenyan musicians
Year of birth missing (living people)